Luedemannella helvata is a bacterium from the genus Luedemannella which has been isolated from soil.

References 

Micromonosporaceae
Bacteria described in 2007